16 Corps, 16th Corps, Sixteenth Corps, or XVI Corps may refer to:

 16th Army Corps (France)
XVI Corps (German Empire), a unit of the Imperial German Army prior to and during World War I
XVI Army Corps (Wehrmacht), a German unit in World War II
XVI Corps (Ottoman Empire)
XVI Corps (India), an Indian Army unit
XVI Corps (United Kingdom), a unit in World War I
XVI Corps (Union Army), a unit in the American Civil War
XVI Corps (United States)

See also
 List of military corps by number